Simone Sheffield is a Talent Manager, Television and Film Producer and Music Coordinator. Among her other works, she has managed Bollywood actresses Aishwarya Rai and Bipasha Basu.

Career 
Sheffield is the owner of the California-based company Canyon Entertainment. In the early 1980s she was credited as a series coordinator, talent coordinator and graphic supervisor for four Motown Records releases. She has managed Aishwarya Rai and Bipasha Basu. In 2011, after serving as Aishwarya Rai's International Representative for over nine years, Sheffield officially terminated her relationship with the artist.

Sheffield has produced feature films, live events, music videos and acted as talent coordinator on such events as: The New 7 Wonders of the World, We Are The World, 1984 Summer Olympics (closing ceremony), Statue of Liberty Celebration, Motown's 25th and 30th Anniversary Shows, Royal Concert Series for the Sultan of Brunei, Nelson Mandela's first visit to America and a Tribute to Rosa Parks and her film credits include The Woodsman, Knockout, Shadowboxer, The Academy Award-winning film "Precious...from the novel Push by Sapphire" and The Paperboy (2012), directed by Lee Daniels starring Academy Award-winning actress Nicole Kidman, with Zac Efron, John Cusack, Macy Gray, and Matthew McConaughey. In (2013) Sheffield Co-Produced Lee Daniels' The Butler directed by Lee Daniels starring Academy Award-winning actors Forest Whitaker, Cuba Gooding Jr., Jane Fonda, Robin Williams, Vanessa Redgrave with Oprah Winfrey, Lenny Kravitz, Terrance Howard, John Cusack, and Mariah Carey.

In (2021) Sheffield Co-Executive Produced "The United States vs Billie Holiday"  A Film by Lee Daniels Cast: Andra Day, Trevante Rhodes, Tyler James Williams, Natasha Lyonne, Miss Lawrence, Da'Vine Joy Randolph, Evan Ross, Leslie Jordan. Also in (2021) Sheffield served as Executive Producer on the Audible Original "PODCAST", “Billie Was a Black Woman” in collaboration with Paramount Pictures and launched exclusively on Audible and Amazon Music on Billie’s birthday, April 7, 2021.

Sheffield was the Music Coordinator for EMPIRE Season 1 (2015), Season 2 (2016), Season 3 (2017), and Season 4 (2018) for FOX TV.
Cast: Terrence Howard, Taraji P. Henson, Jussie Smollett, Trai Byers, Bryshere Y. Gray, Grace Gealey, Serayah, Gabourey Sidibe, and Ta'Rhonda Jones.

Sheffield was the Music Coordinator for STAR Season 1 (PILOT) for FOX TV - (2017)
Cast: Queen Latifah, Benjamin Bratt, Jude Demorest, Brittany O'Grady, Ryan Destiny, Amiyah Scott, Tyrese Gibson, and Naomi Campbell.

Sheffield's philosophy on global entertainment is captured in her quote for The Huffington Post:

Talent Consultant 
Sheffield has worked as a Talent Consultant to The Grammy Awards, Latin Grammy Awards, American Music Awards, WB Radio Music Awards, Billboard Music Awards, MTV Music Video Awards, Soul Train Awards, Golden Globe Awards, People's Choice Awards, Academy Awards, ESPN Sports Awards, Rosa Parks Foundation, American Cancer Society, American Heart Association, Aids Projects L.A, Multiple Sclerosis, United Red Cross and City of Hope National Medical Center, according to one of her websites.

Charity work 
In the 1980s she dedicated her time to feminist projects and the film arts by organizing 'PEP' (Principals, Equality, and Professionalism in Films).
Sheffield is working in support of the We Shall Overcome Foundation and represented Butler Films LLC on behalf of Lee Daniels in the legal case to place the iconic anthem "We Shall Overcome" into Public Domain.The case was won on January 26, 2018. We Shall Overcome has been officially placed into Public Domain.

Filmography 

Producer
 Rock The Vote (1999 PSA)
 Knockout (2000)
 Extreme Bikers (2000)
 Sturgis 60th Anniversary (2000)
 Women on Wheels (2000)
 The Life (2000)
 Leather, Boots and Tattoos (2000)
 The Woodsman (2004)
 Shadowboxer (2005)
 Precious''' (2009)
 The Paperboy (2012)
 Lee Daniels' The Butler (2013)
 We Shall Overcome: The Documentary (2018)
 The United States vs Billie Holiday - Film  (2021)
 Billie Was a Black Woman - Podcast  (2021)

Music coordinator
 Loving Couples (1980)
 The Last Song (1980)
 Motown 25: Yesterday, Today & Forever (1983 TV Special) (1983)
 Motown 30: What's Goin' On! (1990 TV Special) (1990)
 Knockout (2000)
 Empire (13 episodes, 2015)
 Empire (18 episodes, 2016)
 Empire (18 episodes, 2017)
 Star (Pilot episode, 2017)
 Empire'' (18 episodes, 2018)

References

External links
 
 

American film producers
American television producers
American women television producers
Year of birth missing (living people)
Living people
21st-century American women